Kenny Wollesen (born 1966) is an American drummer and percussionist.

Wollesen has recorded and toured with Tom Waits, Sean Lennon, Ron Sexsmith, Bill Frisell, Norah Jones, John Lurie, Myra Melford, Steven Bernstein, and John Zorn. He is a founding member of the New Klezmer Trio and a member of the Sex Mob and Himalayas groups.

He grew up in Capitola, California, studying at Aptos High School, and spending many teenage years playing with Donny McCaslin. He spent quality classroom time with flugelhornist and arranger Ray Brown at Cabrillo College. He also arranges and studied vibraphone at Cabrillo. 

Wollesen utilizes the Burton grip when playing vibraphone.

Discography

As leader or co-leader
 Pitch, Rhythm and Consciousness (New Artists, 2011)
 The Gnostic Preludes: Music of Splendor (Tzadik, 2012)
 John Zorn: The Mysteries (Tzadik, 2013)
 Rasa Rasa (Tzadik, 2014)

With the Himalayas
 Son of Rogues Gallery: Pirate Ballads, Sea Songs & Chanteys (ANTI-, 2013)

With Myra Melford
 2000 Dance Beyond the Color, Myra Melford's Crush
 2004 Where the Two Worlds Touch, Myra Melford's the Tent

With New Klezmer Trio
 Masks and Faces (Nine Winds, 1991 / Tzadik, 1996)
 Melt Zonk Rewire (Tzadik, 1995)
 Short for Something (Tzadik, 2000)

With Sexmob
 1998 Din of Inequity
 2000 Solid Sender
 2000 Theatre & Dance
 2001 Sex Mob Does Bond
 2003 Dime Grind Palace
 2006 Sexotica
 2013 Cinema, Circus & Spaghetti: Sexmob Plays Fellini
 2009 Sex Mob Meets Medeski: Live in Willisau

With others
 1997 Interpretations of Lessness, Andy Laster's Lessness
 1997 The Loan, Brad Shepik
 1998 At Home, Slow Poke
 1998 Fabulous, Drop Curlew
 2000 Hidden Gardens, Lan Xang
 2000 Redemption, Slow Poke
 2006 Ways Not to Lose, The Wood Brothers

As sideman
With Steve Beresford
 Signals for Tea (Avant, 1995)

With David Byrne
 Grown Backwards (Elektra/Nonesuch, 2004)

With Nels Cline
 Lovers (Blue Note, 2016)

With Crash Test Dummies
 I Don't Care That You Don't Mind (Cha-Ching, 2001)
 Jingle All the Way (Cha-Ching, 2002)

With Sylvie Courvoisier
 Double Windsor (Tzadik, 2014)
 D’Agala (Intakt, 2018)

With Trevor Dunn's trio-convulsant
Debutantes & Centipedes (Buzz, 1998)
With Bill Frisell
 Blues Dream (Elektra/Nonesuch, 2001)
 Unspeakable (Elektra/Nonesuch, 2004)
 East/West (Elektra/Nonesuch, 2005)
 Further East/Further West (Elektra/Nonesuch, 2005)
 History, Mystery (Elektra/Nonesuch, 2008)
 All We Are Saying (Savoy Jazz, 2011)
 The Kentucky Derby Is Decadent and Depraved (2012)
 Guitar in the Space Age! (OKeh, 2014)

With Ben Goldberg
 The Relative Value of Things (33¼, 1992)
 Orphic Machine (2015)

With Jesse Harris
 2003 The Secret Sun
 2004 While the Music Lasts
 2006 Mineral
 2010 Cosmo

With Rickie Lee Jones
 2003 The Evening of My Best Day (2003)
 2009 Balm in Gilead

With Julian Lage
 ARCLIGHT (Mack Avenue, 2016)
 Modern Lore (Mack Avenue, 2018)

With Sean Lennon
 Into the Sun (Grand Royal, 1998)

With Rudy Linka
 2002 Simple Pleasures
 2007 Beyond the New York City Limits

With Kate McGarry
 2001 Show Me
 2005 Mercy Streets

With Ruper Ordorika
 Dabilen Harria (Nuevos Medios, 1999)
 Hurrengo goizean (Metak, 2002)
 Kantuok jartzen ditut (Metak, 2004)
 Memoriaren Mapan (Elkar, 2006)
 Haizea Garizumakoa (Elkar, 2009)
 Hodeien azpian (Elkar, 2011)
 Lurrean etzanda (Elkar, 2014)
 Guria ostatuan (Elkar, 2016)
 Amour et toujours (Elkar, 2021)

With Ellen Reid
 2001 Cinderellen  (Mr. Friendly)

With Carrie Rodriguez/Chip Taylor
 2005 Red Dog Tracks
 2006 Seven Angels on a Bicycle
 2007 Live from the Ruhr Triennale
 2010 The New Bye & Bye

With Jenny Scheinman
 2002 The Rabbi's Lover
 2004 Shalagaster
 2008 Crossing the Field
 2008 Jenny Scheinman

With Tony Scherr
 2002 Come Around
 2007 Twist in the Wind

With John Scofield
 2000 Bump

With Leni Stern
 2000 Kindness of Strangers
 2004 When Evening Falls

With Rufus Wainwright
 2003 Want One
 2007 Release the Stars

With Tom Waits
 1993 The Black Rider (Island)

With John Zorn
 Bar Kokhba (Tzadik, 1994–96)
 Filmworks VIII: 1997 (Tzadik, 1998)
 Filmworks XIII: Invitation to a Suicide (Tzadik, 2002)
 Filmworks XIV: Hiding and Seeking (Tzadik, 2003)
 50th Birthday Celebration Volume 4 (Tzadik, 2004) with Electric Masada
 Voices in the Wilderness (Tzadik, 2003)
 Electric Masada: At the Mountains of Madness (Tzadik, 2005) with Electric Masada
 Filmworks XVII: Notes on Marie Menken/Ray Bandar: A Life with Skulls (Tzadik, 2006)
 Filmworks XVIII: The Treatment (Tzadik, 2006)
 The Dreamers (Tzadik, 2008)
 Filmworks XXI: Belle de Nature/The New Rijksmuseum (Tzadik, 2008)
 O'o (Tzadik, 2009) with The Dreamers
 Filmworks XXIV: The Nobel Prizewinner (Tzadik, 2010)
 Ipos: Book of Angels Volume 14 (Tzadik, 2010) with The Dreamers
 Baal: Book of Angels Volume 15 (Tzadik, 2010) with Ben Goldberg Quartet
 In Search of the Miraculous (Tzadik, 2010)
 Dictée/Liber Novus (Tzadik, 2010)
 Interzone (Tzadik, 2010)
 The Goddess – Music for the Ancient of Days (Tzadik, 2010)
 The Satyr's Play / Cerberus (Tzadik, 2011)
 Nova Express (Tzadik, 2011) with the Nova Quartet
 At the Gates of Paradise (Tzadik, 2011)
 A Dreamers Christmas (Tzadik, 2011) with The Dreamers
 Mount Analogue (Tzadik, 2012)
 The Gnostic Preludes (Tzadik, 2012) with the Gnostic Trio
 Rimbaud (Tzadik, 2012)
 A Vision in Blakelight (Tzadik, 2012)
 Music and Its Double (Tzadik, 2012)
 The Concealed (Tzadik, 2012)
 The Mysteries (Tzadik, 2013) with the Gnostic Trio
 Dreamachines (Tzadik, 2013) with the Nova Quartet
 In Lambeth (Tzadik, 2013) with the Gnostic Trio
 On Leaves of Grass (Tzadik, 2014) with the Nova Quartet
 The Testament of Solomon (Tzadik, 2014) with the Gnostic Trio
 Pellucidar: A Dreamers Fantabula (Tzadik, 2015) with The Dreamers
 The Mockingbird (2016)
 The Painted Bird (2016)

With others
 1990 And Then There's This, Jessica Williams
 1996 Dreamland, Madeleine Peyroux
 1996 The Sun Died, Ellery Eskelin
 1998 Dopamine, Mitchell Froom
 1999 Thoroughfare, Rebecca Martin
 1999 Work in Progress 89-98, Wolfgang Muthspiel
 2000 Shebang, Steve Cardenas
 2001 Buttermilk Channel, Adam Levy
 2002 Come Away with Me, Norah Jones
 2008 The Living and the Dead, Jolie Holland
 2009 Trombone Tribe, Roswell Rudd
 2011 Everything is Alive, Hank Roberts
 2011 Graylen Epicenter, David Binney
 2012 Howie 61, Wayne Krantz
 2013 Another Life, James Maddock
 2013 Ghost on Ghost, Iron & Wine
 2014 Natalie Merchant, Natalie Merchant
 2015 Didn't He Ramble, Glen Hansard

References 

American jazz drummers
Jewish American musicians
Living people
Avant-garde jazz drummers
1966 births
20th-century American drummers
American male drummers
20th-century American male musicians
American male jazz musicians
The Lounge Lizards members
Sexmob members
Trevor Dunn's Trio-Convulsant members
21st-century American Jews
American jazz vibraphonists